Written Chinese comprises Chinese characters used to represent the Chinese language. Chinese characters do not constitute an alphabet or a compact syllabary. Rather, the writing system is roughly logosyllabic; that is, a character generally represents one syllable of spoken Chinese and may be a word on its own or a part of a polysyllabic word. The characters themselves are often composed of parts that may represent physical objects, abstract notions, or pronunciation. Literacy requires the memorization of a great number of characters: college-educated Chinese speakers know about 4,000. The large number of Chinese characters has in part led to the adoption of Western alphabets or other complementary systems as auxiliary means of representing Chinese.

Various current Chinese characters have been traced back to the late Shang Dynasty about 1200–1050 BC, but the process of creating characters is thought to have begun some centuries earlier.  After a period of variation and evolution, Chinese characters were standardized under the Qin Dynasty (221–206 BC).  Over the millennia, these characters have evolved into well-developed styles of Chinese calligraphy. As the varieties of Chinese diverged, a situation of diglossia developed, with speakers of mutually unintelligible varieties able to communicate through writing using Classical Chinese. In the early 20th century, Classical Chinese was replaced in this role by written vernacular Chinese, corresponding to the standard spoken language ("Mandarin"). Although most other varieties of Chinese are not written, there are traditions of written Cantonese, written Shanghainese and written Hokkien, among others.

Some Chinese characters have been adopted into writing systems of other neighbouring East Asian languages, but are currently used only in Japanese and to a lesser extent in Korean, as Vietnamese is now written using alphabetic script.

Structure

Written Chinese is not based on an alphabet or a compact syllabary.  Instead, Chinese characters are glyphs whose components may depict objects or represent abstract notions.  Occasionally a character consists of only one component; more commonly two or more components are combined to form more complex characters, using a variety of different principles.  The best known exposition of Chinese character composition is the Shuowen Jiezi, compiled by Xu Shen around 120 AD.  Since Xu Shen did not have access to Chinese characters in their earliest forms, his analysis cannot always be taken as authoritative.  Nonetheless, no later work has supplanted the Shuowen Jiezi in terms of breadth, and it is still relevant to etymological research today.

Derivation of characters

According to the Shuowen Jiezi, Chinese characters are developed on six basic principles.  (These principles, though popularized by the Shuowen Jiezi, were developed earlier; the oldest known mention of them is in the Rites of Zhou, a text from about 150 BC.)  The first two principles produce simple characters, known as 文 wén:

  xiàngxíng: Pictographs, in which the character is a graphical depiction of the object it denotes.  Examples: 人 rén "person", 日 rì "sun", 木 mù "tree/wood". 
  zhǐshì: Indicatives, or ideographs, in which the character represents an abstract notion.  Examples: 上 shàng "up", 下 xià "down", 三 sān "three". 

The remaining four principles produce complex characters historically called 字 zì (although this term is now generally used to refer to all characters, whether simple or complex).  Of these four, two construct characters from simpler parts:

 / huìyì: Logical aggregates, in which two or more parts are used for their meaning.  This yields a composite meaning, which is then applied to the new character.  E.g., / dōng "east", which represents a sun rising in the trees. 
 / xíngshēng: Phonetic complexes, in which one part—often called the radical—indicates the general semantic category of the character (such as water-related or eye-related), and the other part is another character, used for its phonetic value.  Example: 晴 qíng "clear/fair (weather)", which is composed of 日 rì "sun", and 青 qīng "blue/green", which is used for its pronunciation. 

In contrast to the popular conception of Chinese as a primarily pictographic or ideographic language, the vast majority of Chinese characters (about 95% of the characters in the Shuowen Jiezi) are constructed as either logical aggregates or, more often, phonetic complexes. In fact, some phonetic complexes were originally simple pictographs that were later augmented by the addition of a semantic root.  An example is 炷 zhù "candle" (now archaic, meaning "lampwick"), which was originally a pictograph of a lampstand, 主, a character that is now pronounced zhǔ and means "host", or the character 火 huǒ "fire" was added to indicate that the meaning is fire related.

The last two principles do not produce new written forms; instead, they transfer new meanings to existing forms:

 / zhuǎnzhù: Transference, in which a character, often with a simple, concrete meaning takes on an extended, more abstract meaning.  Example: 網/网 wǎng "net", which was originally a pictograph depicting a fishing net.  Over time, it has taken on an extended meaning, covering any kind of lattice; for instance, it can be used to refer to a computer network. 
  jiǎjiè: Borrowing, in which a character is used, either intentionally or accidentally, for some entirely different purpose.  Example: 哥 gē "older brother", which is written with a character originally meaning "song/sing", now written 歌 gē.  Once, there was no character for "older brother", so an otherwise unrelated character with the right pronunciation was borrowed for that meaning. 

Chinese characters are written to fit into a square, even when composed of two simpler forms written side-by-side or top-to-bottom.  In such cases, each form is compressed to fit the entire character into a square.

Strokes

Character components can be further subdivided into strokes.  The strokes of Chinese characters fall into eight main categories: horizontal (一), vertical (丨),  left-falling (丿), right-falling (丶), rising (lower element of 冫), dot (、), hook (亅), and turning (乛, 乚, 乙, etc.).

There are eight basic rules of stroke order in writing a Chinese character:

 Horizontal strokes are written before vertical ones.
 Left-falling strokes are written before right-falling ones.
 Characters are written from top to bottom.
 Characters are written from left to right.
 If a character is framed from above, the frame is written first.
 If a character is framed from below, the frame is written last.
 Frames are closed last.
 In a symmetrical character, the middle is drawn first, then the sides.

These rules do not strictly apply to every situation and are occasionally violated.

Layout

Since Chinese characters conform to a roughly square frame and are not linked to one another, they do not require a set orientation in writing. Traditionally, Chinese text was written in vertical columns which were read from top to bottom, right-to-left; the first column being on the right side of the page, and the last column on the left. Text written in Classical Chinese also uses little or no punctuation, with sentence and phrase breaks being determined by context and rhythm.

In modern times, the familiar Western layout used for Latin, Greek, and Cyrillic scriptsleft-to-right orientation on horizontal lines advancing from top to bottom on the pagehas become more popular in regions using Simplified Chinese such as in the People's Republic of China, where the government mandated left-to-right writing in 1955, although the vertical format is still used for effect or where space requires it, such as signs or on spines of books.  The government of the Republic of China (Taiwan) followed suit in 2004 for official documents, but vertical writing on lines advancing from right to left on the page remains popular everywhere else, such as in print.

(Chinese script is less frequently written from right to left on horizontal lines; such an orientation, conceptually corresponding to vertical writing on lines advancing from right to left with only a single character per vertical line, seldom occurs apart from occasional usage in signage or banners, though left-to-right orientation is more common.)

The use of punctuation has also become more common, whether the text is written in columns or rows.  The punctuation marks used in Simplified Chinese are clearly influenced by their Western counterparts, although some marks are particular to Asian languages: for example, the double and single quotation marks (『 』 and 「 」); the hollow period dot (。), which is otherwise used just like an ordinary period full-stop; and a special kind of comma called an enumeration comma (、), which is used to separate items in a list, as opposed to clauses in a sentence. Traditional Chinese retains the use of these quotation marks while Simplified Chinese has abandoned them for western ones.

Evolution

Chinese is one of the oldest continually-used writing-systems still in use. The earliest generally accepted examples of Chinese writing date back to the reign of the Shang Dynasty king Wu Ding (1250–1192 BC).  These were divinatory inscriptions on oracle bones, primarily ox scapulae and turtle shells.  Characters were carved on the bones in order to frame a question; the bones were then heated over a fire and the resulting cracks were interpreted to determine the answer.  Such characters are called 甲骨文 jiǎgǔwén "shell-bone script" or oracle bone script.

In 2003, some 11 isolated symbols carved on tortoise shells were found at Jiahu, an archaeological site in the Henan province of China, some bearing a striking resemblance to certain modern characters, such as 目 mù "eye".  Since the Jiahu site dates from about 6600 BC, it predates the earliest confirmed Chinese writing by more than 5,000 years.  Dr Garman Harbottle, of the Brookhaven National Laboratory in New York, US, who headed a team of archaeologists at the University of Science and Technology of China, in Anhui province, has suggested that these symbols were precursors of Chinese writing, but  Professor David Keightley, of the University of California, Berkeley, US whose field of expertise is the origins of Chinese civilization in the Neolithic and early Bronze Ages, employing  archaeological and inscriptional evidence, suggests that the time gap is too great for a connection.

From the late Shang Dynasty, Chinese writing evolved into the form found in cast inscriptions on Chinese ritual bronzes made during the Western Zhou Dynasty (c 1046–771 BC) and the Spring and Autumn period (770–476 BC), a kind of writing called 金文 jīnwén "metal script".  Jinwen characters are less angular and angularized than the oracle bone script.  Later, in the Warring States period (475–221 BC), the script became still more regular, and settled on a form, called 六國文字/六国文字 liùguó wénzì "script of the six states", that Xu Shen used as source material in the Shuowen Jiezi.  These characters were later embellished and stylized to yield the seal script, which represents the oldest form of Chinese characters still in modern use.  They are used principally for signature seals, or chops, which are often used in place of a signature for Chinese documents and artwork.  Li Si promulgated the seal script as the standard throughout the empire during the Qin dynasty, then newly unified.

Seal script in turn evolved into the other surviving writing styles; the first writing style to follow was the clerical script.  The development of such a style can be attributed to those of the Qin Dynasty who were seeking to create a convenient form of written characters for daily usage. In general, clerical script characters are "flat" in appearance, being wider than the seal script, which tends to be taller than it is wide. Compared with the seal script, clerical script characters are strikingly rectilinear.  In running script, a semi-cursive form, the character elements begin to run into each other, although the characters themselves generally remain separate.  Running script eventually evolved into grass script, a fully cursive form, in which the characters are often entirely unrecognizable by their canonical forms.  Grass script gives the impression of anarchy in its appearance, and there is indeed considerable freedom on the part of the calligrapher, but this freedom is circumscribed by conventional "abbreviations" in the forms of the characters.  Regular script, a non-cursive form, is the most widely recognized script.  In regular script, each stroke of each character is clearly drawn out from the others.  Even though both the running and grass scripts appear to be derived as semi-cursive and cursive variants of regular script, it is in fact the regular script that was the last to develop.

Regular script is considered the archetype for Chinese writing and forms the basis for most printed forms.  In addition, regular script imposes a stroke order, which must be followed in order for the characters to be written correctly.  (Strictly speaking, this stroke order applies to the clerical, running, and grass scripts as well, but especially in the running and grass scripts, this order is occasionally deviated from.)  Thus, for instance, the character 木 mù "wood" must be written starting with the horizontal stroke, drawn from left to right; next, the vertical stroke, from top to bottom; next, the left diagonal stroke, from top to bottom; and lastly the right diagonal stroke, from top to bottom.

Simplified and traditional Chinese

In the 20th century, written Chinese diverged into two canonical forms, simplified Chinese and traditional Chinese. Simplified Chinese was developed in Mainland China in order to reduce the number of characters and the average stroke count per character.  The People's Republic of China claims that the rapid increase in literacy rates have been achieved as a result, but some external observers attribute the achievement to education reforms and the increase in standards of living instead.  Little systematic research has been conducted to prove that simplified Chinese has affected literacy rates in any way as the only studies conducted in mainland China focused on arbitrary statistics quantifying the number of strokes saved on average in samples of running text.

The simplified forms have also been widely criticized for being inconsistent.  For instance, traditional 讓 ràng "allow" is simplified to 让, in which the phonetic on the right side is reduced from 17 strokes to just three.  (The speech radical on the left has also been simplified.)  However, the same phonetic component is used in its full form, even in simplified Chinese, in such characters as 壤 rǎng "soil" and 齉 nàng "snuffle"; these forms remained unmodified because they were relatively uncommon and would therefore represent a negligible stroke reduction.  On the other hand, some simplified forms are simply long-standing calligraphic abbreviations, as for example 万 wàn "ten thousand", for which the traditional Chinese form is 萬.

While Simplified Chinese became standard in Mainland China, Singapore and Malaysia, Traditional Chinese continues to be the standard in Hong Kong, Macau, Taiwan and other overseas Chinese communities.  Throughout this article, Chinese text is given in both simplified and traditional forms when they differ, with the traditional forms being given first. The two forms are never mixed together when written.

Function

At the inception of written Chinese, spoken Chinese was monosyllabic; that is, Chinese words expressing independent concepts (objects, actions, relations, etc.) were usually one syllable.  Each written character corresponded to one monosyllabic word.  The spoken language has since become polysyllabic, but because modern polysyllabic words are usually composed of older monosyllabic words, Chinese characters have always been used to represent individual Chinese syllables.

For over two thousand years, the prevailing written standard was a vocabulary and syntax rooted in Chinese as spoken around the time of Confucius (about 500 BC), called Classical Chinese, or 文言文 wényánwén.  Over the centuries, Classical Chinese gradually acquired some of its grammar and character senses from the various dialects.  This accretion was generally slow and minor; however, by the 20th century, Classical Chinese was distinctly different from any contemporary dialect, and had to be learned separately.  Once learned, it was a common medium for communication between people speaking different dialects, many of which were mutually unintelligible by the end of the first millennium AD.  A Mandarin speaker might say yī, a Cantonese yāt, a Shanghainese iq, and a Hokkien chit, but all four will understand the character  to mean "one".

Chinese languages and dialects vary by not only pronunciation, but also, to a lesser extent, vocabulary and grammar.  Modern written Chinese, which replaced Classical Chinese as the written standard as an indirect result of the May Fourth Movement of 1919, is not technically bound to any single variety; however, it most nearly represents the vocabulary and syntax of Mandarin, by far the most widespread Chinese dialectal family in terms of both geographical area and number of speakers.  This version of written Chinese is called Vernacular Chinese, or 白話/白话 báihuà (literally, "plain speech").  Despite its ties to the dominant Mandarin language, Vernacular Chinese also permits some communication between people of different dialects, limited by the fact that Vernacular Chinese expressions are often ungrammatical or unidiomatic in non-Mandarin dialects.  This role may not differ substantially from the role of other linguae francae, such as Latin.  For those trained in written Chinese, it serves as a common medium; for those untrained in it, the graphic nature of the characters is in general no aid to common understanding (characters such as "one" notwithstanding).  In this regard, Chinese characters may be considered a large and inefficient phonetic script.  However, Ghil'ad Zuckermann's exploration of phono-semantic matching in Standard Chinese concludes that the Chinese writing system is multifunctional, conveying both semantic and phonetic content.

The variation in vocabulary among dialects has also led to the informal use of "dialectal characters", as well as standard characters that are nevertheless considered archaic by today's standards.  Cantonese is unique among non-Mandarin regional languages in having a written colloquial standard, used in Hong Kong and overseas, with a large number of unofficial characters for words particular to this language.  Written colloquial Cantonese has become quite popular in online chat rooms and instant messaging, although for formal written communications Cantonese speakers still normally use Vernacular Chinese. To a lesser degree Hokkien is used in a similar way in Taiwan and elsewhere, although it lacks the level of standardization seen in Cantonese. However, the Ministry of Education of the Republic of China is currently releasing a standard character set for Hokkien, which is to be taught in schools and promoted amongst the general population.

Other languages

Chinese characters were first introduced into Japanese sometime in the first half of the first millennium AD, probably from Chinese products imported into Japan through Korea.  At the time, Japanese had no native written system, and Chinese characters were used for the most part to represent Japanese words with the corresponding meanings, rather than similar pronunciations.  A notable exception to this rule was the system of man'yōgana, which used a small set of Chinese characters to help indicate pronunciation.  The man'yōgana later developed into the phonetic syllabaries, hiragana and katakana.

Chinese characters are called hànzì in Mandarin, after the Han Dynasty of China; in Japanese, this was pronounced kanji.  In modern written Japanese, kanji are used for most nouns, verb stems, and adjective stems, while hiragana are used for grammatical elements and miscellaneous words that have no common kanji rendition; katakana are used for transliteration of loanwords from other languages, the names of plants, animals and certain scientific or technical words, onomatopoeia and emphasis.  The Jōyō kanji, a list of kanji for common use standardized by the Japanese government, contains 2,136 characters—about half the number of characters commanded by literate Chinese speakers.

When used for Korean, Chinese characters are called hanja, which served as the first writing system for the language.  Many Chinese characters were introduced into Korean for their meaning, just as in Japanese.  However, with the creation during the reign of King Sejong of Hangeul, an alphabetic writing system in which letters are grouped into syllabic square blocks, the use of hanja in Korean has largely been replaced by Hangeul in South Korea and almost exclusively replaced by Chosŏn'gŭl (the North Korean term for Hangeul) in North Korea.

Similarly, Vietnamese was originally written using Chinese-derived characters called chữ nôm script, which has been supplanted by the Latin-based Vietnamese alphabet in modern usage.

Chinese characters are also used within China to write non-Han languages. The largest non-Han group in China, the Zhuang, have for over 1300 years used Chinese characters. Despite both the introduction of an official alphabetic script in 1957 and lack of a corresponding official set of Chinese characters, more Zhuang people can read the Zhuang logograms than the alphabetic script.

Media
Over the history of written Chinese, a variety of media have been used for writing. They include:
 Bamboo and wooden slips, from at least the thirteenth century BC
 Paper, invented no later than the second century BC
 Silk, since at least the Han dynasty
 Stone, metal, wood, bamboo, plastic and ivory on seals.

Since at least the Han dynasty, such media have been used to create hanging scrolls and handscrolls.

Literacy

Because the majority of modern Chinese words contain more than one character, there are at least two measuring sticks for Chinese literacy: the number of characters known, and the number of words known.  John DeFrancis, in the introduction to his Advanced Chinese Reader, estimates that a typical Chinese college graduate recognizes 4,000 to 5,000 characters, and 40,000 to 60,000 words.  Jerry Norman, in Chinese, places the number of characters somewhat lower, at 3,000 to 4,000. These counts are complicated by the tangled development of Chinese characters.  In many cases, a single character came to be written in multiple ways. This development was restrained to an extent by the standardization of the seal script during the Qin dynasty, but soon started again. Although the Shuowen Jiezi lists 10,516 characters—9,353 of them unique (some of which may already have been out of use by the time it was compiled) plus 1,163 graphic variants—the Jiyun of the Northern Song Dynasty, compiled less than a thousand years later in 1039, contains 53,525 characters, most of them graphic variants.

Dictionaries

Written Chinese is not based on an alphabet or syllabary, so Chinese dictionaries, as well as dictionaries that define Chinese characters in other languages, cannot easily be alphabetized or otherwise lexically ordered, as English dictionaries are.  The need to arrange Chinese characters in order to permit efficient lookup has given rise to a considerable variety of ways to organize and index the characters.

A traditional mechanism is the method of radicals, which uses a set of character roots.  These roots, or radicals, generally but imperfectly align with the parts used to compose characters by means of logical aggregation and phonetic complex.  A canonical set of 214 radicals was developed during the rule of the Kangxi Emperor (around the year 1700); these are sometimes called the Kangxi radicals.  The radicals are ordered first by stroke count (that is, the number of strokes required to write the radical); within a given stroke count, the radicals also have a prescribed order.

Every Chinese character falls (sometimes arbitrarily or incorrectly) under the heading of exactly one of these 214 radicals.  In many cases, the radicals are themselves characters, which naturally come first under their own heading.  All other characters under a given radical are ordered by the stroke count of the character.   Usually, however, there are still many characters with a given stroke count under a given radical.  At this point, characters are not given in any recognizable order; the user must locate the character by going through all the characters with that stroke count, typically listed for convenience at the top of the page on which they occur.

Because the method of radicals is applied only to the written character, one need not know how to pronounce a character before looking it up; the entry, once located, usually gives the pronunciation.  However, it is not always easy to identify which of the various roots of a character is the proper radical.  Accordingly, dictionaries often include a list of hard to locate characters, indexed by total stroke count, near the beginning of the dictionary.  Some dictionaries include almost one-seventh of all characters in this list. Alternatively, some dictionaries list "difficult" characters under more than one radical, with all but one of those entries redirecting the reader to the "canonical" location of the character according to Kangxi.

Other methods of organization exist, often in an attempt to address the shortcomings of the radical method, but are less common.  For instance, it is common for a dictionary ordered principally by the Kangxi radicals to have an auxiliary index by pronunciation, expressed typically in either hanyu pinyin or zhuyin fuhao.  This index points to the page in the main dictionary where the desired character can be found.  Other methods use only the structure of the characters, such as the four-corner method, in which characters are indexed according to the kinds of strokes located nearest the four corners (hence the name of the method), or the Cangjie method, in which characters are broken down into a set of 24 basic components.  Neither the four-corner method nor the Cangjie method requires the user to identify the proper radical, although many strokes or components have alternate forms, which must be memorized in order to use these methods effectively.

The availability of computerized Chinese dictionaries now makes it possible to look characters up by any of the indexing schemes described, thereby shortening the search process.

Transliteration and romanization

Chinese characters do not reliably indicate their pronunciation, even for one dialect.  It is therefore useful to be able to transliterate a dialect of Chinese into the Latin alphabet or the Perso-Arabic script Xiao'erjing for those who cannot read Chinese characters.  However, transliteration was not always considered merely a way to record the sounds of any particular dialect of Chinese; it was once also considered a potential replacement for the Chinese characters.  This was first prominently proposed during the May Fourth Movement, and it gained further support with the victory of the Communists in 1949.  Immediately afterward, the mainland government began two parallel programs relating to written Chinese.  One was the development of an alphabetic script for Mandarin, which was spoken by about two-thirds of the Chinese population; the other was the simplification of the traditional characters—a process that would eventually lead to simplified Chinese.  The latter was not viewed as an impediment to the former; rather, it would ease the transition toward the exclusive use of an alphabetic (or at least phonetic) script.

By 1958, however, priority was given officially to simplified Chinese; a phonetic script, hanyu pinyin, had been developed, but its deployment to the exclusion of simplified characters was pushed off to some distant future date.  The association between pinyin and Mandarin, as opposed to other dialects, may have contributed to this deferment.  It seems unlikely that pinyin will supplant Chinese characters anytime soon as the sole means of representing Chinese.

Pinyin uses the Latin alphabet, along with a few diacritical marks, to represent the sounds of Mandarin in standard pronunciation.  For the most part, pinyin uses vowel and consonant letters as they are used in Romance languages (and also in IPA).  However, although 'b' and 'p', for instance, represent the voice/unvoiced distinction in some languages, such as French, they represent the unaspirated/aspirated distinction in Mandarin; Mandarin has few voiced consonants.  Also, the pinyin spellings for a few consonant sounds are markedly different from their spellings in other languages that use the Latin alphabet; for instance, pinyin 'q' and 'x' sound similar to English 'ch' and 'sh', respectively.  Pinyin is not the sole transliteration scheme for Mandarin—there are also, for instance, the zhuyin fuhao, Wade-Giles, Yale, EFEO and Gwoyeu Romatzyh systems—but it is dominant in the Chinese-speaking world.  All transliterations in this article use the pinyin system.

See also
Mainland Chinese Braille
Taiwanese braille (Taiwanese Mandarin)
Cantonese braille
Chinese input methods for computers

References

Citations

Works cited

Further reading
 
  (English translation of Wénzìxué Gàiyào 文字學概要, Shangwu, 1988.)

External links
Yue E Li and Christopher Upward. "Review of the process of reform in the simplification of Chinese Characters".  (Journal of Simplified Spelling Society, 1992/2 pp. 14–16, later designated J13)
WrittenChinese.Com English to Chinese Dictionary Includes example sentences, how to write the character, native Mandarin audio and more.
Free Online Dictionary Look up Chinese, Pinyin or English; includes stroke animation and sound.
Mandarin Chinese children's story in simplified Chinese showing the stroke order for every character.

Chinese language
Chinese
Chinese orthography